Jozef „jef" Schils (4 September 1931, in Kersbeek-Miskom – 3 March 2007, in Liège) was a Belgian cyclist.

In 1952, at the age of 21, Jozef Schils, who had just become a professional racing cyclist and was still in the army, became Belgian road racing champion. He was nominated for the road world championships in Luxembourg in the same year and finished tenth.

Schils rode as a professional until 1965 and won around 40 Belgian criteria during this time . 1953 was his most successful year, in which he won Paris-Tours and the National Sluitingsprijs . In 1955 he won at Nokere Koerse . His nickname was "little Coppi", because Fausto Coppi had praised him. However, he turned down offers to go to Italy. In 1960, however, he switched to the French team " Mercier ", which was led by Antonin Magne and in which Raymond Poulidor drove. At the end of the season he had a hard crash and again in 1961. In 1965 he ended his career.

Then Jozef Schils opened a café in Koekelberg , later a laundry and a bicycle shop. Jozef Schils was the father of the former professional racing cyclist Patrick Schils and was the grandfather of Dominic Schils, also a racing cyclist of note.

Major results
Source:

1952
 Belgian Road Champion
Tour de Romandie
Stage 3a
1953
Paris–Tours
National Closing Price
Grand Prix of Walloon Brabant
Grand Prix of Haspengouw
1954
Tour of Hesbaye
Three sister cities
Brussels-Bost
Grand Prix of Brabant Wallon
4th Paris-Brussels
1955
Nokere Koerse
Grand Prix of Vilvoorde
Hoeilaart-Diest-Hoeilaart
8th Liège–Bastogne–Liège
8th Paris–Tours
1956
Brussels Ingooigem
Scheldt-Dender-Lys
Salt Cup
2nd Western Circuit
1957
Flemish Region Tour
Flèche Halloise
Brussels-Bost
2nd Mandel-Lys-Scheldt Circuit
2nd Brussels-Ingooigem
3rd Coppa Bernocchi
1958
Tour of the Netherlands
Stage 5
Tour du Levant
Stage 3 (TTT)
Three days of Antwerp
Stage 3
Antwerp-Genk
GP Marvan
Stage 1
3rd overall
2nd Milan-Mantova
2nd Flandria GP
2nd National Closing Price
4th Tour of Lombardy
1959
Circuit of the three provinces
Tour du Levant
Stages 1b and 5
1960
Flèche hesbignonne-Cras Avernas
Grand Prix of Isbergues
Tour of Belgium
Stages 2 and 4b
Circuit of Basse-Sambre
Grand Prix of Zottegem
Tour du Nord
Stage 4
2nd Paris-Valenciennes
2nd Escaut-Dendre-Lys
2nd Salt Cup
3rd GP Flandria
3rd Circuit of East Flanders
1961
Hoegaarden-Antwerp-Hoegaarden
1962
Flèche hesbignonne-Cras Avernas
Grand Prix of Zottegem
3rd Race of the grapes
3rd Escaut-Dendre-Lys
10th La Flèche Wallonne
1963
2nd Circuit du Houtland
1964
2nd Grand Prix Pino Cerami

References

1931 births
2007 deaths
Belgian male cyclists
Cyclists from Flemish Brabant
People from Kortenaken
Articles lacking reliable references from October 2017
Articles needing cleanup from October 2017